Matteo Lunati (born 2 July 1987) is an Italian footballer who plays as a midfielder for  club Calcio Portogruaro Summaga.

Club career 
After spending his youth years with Spal and Milan, Lunati made his first-team debut for the Rossoneri in a Coppa Italia game against Brescia on 8 November 2006. Milan, however, loaned him out for the 2008–09 season to San Marino and Como.

In August 2010, Lunati signed for Serie D side Real Rimini.

References

External links 
  
 

1987 births
Living people
Sportspeople from Ferrara
Italian footballers
A.C. Milan players
A.S.D. Victor San Marino players
S.P.A.L. players
Como 1907 players
A.S.D. Portogruaro players
Association football midfielders
Footballers from Emilia-Romagna